The Draper Leidig Building, also known as the Leidig Building, is a historic mixed-use commercial building in Carmel-by-the-Sea, California. It was designed by Blaine & Olsen and built in 1929, by C. H. Lawrence. It is an example of Spanish Revival style. The structure is recognized as an important commercial building in the city's Downtown Conservation District Historic Property Survey, and was nominated and submitted to the California Register of Historical Resources on May 22, 2002. The building is occupied by four shops, Photography West Gallery, La Renaissance Jewelry, Caraccioli Cellars, and Girl Lee Boutique.

History

The Draper Leidig Building is a two-story commercial Spanish Colonial Revival-style building on Dolores Street between Ocean Avenue and 7th Avenue in Carmel-by-the-Sea, California. Architect Blaine & Olsen designed and C. H. Lawrence, both of Oakland, California, constructed the building in 1929. It was owned by Robert G. Leidig (1879–1970) and Isabel Martin-Leidig (1884–1961), and their daughter Jean E. Leidig (1917–2012), who married Raymond Jesse Draper (1916-1981). The original cost, in 1929, to build the commercial building was $24,000. An announcement of the Leidig building took place on March 3, 1929, in the ‘’Carmel Pine Cone,’’ with the headline “Leidig Building Near Completion.”

The building is opposite the Mary Dummage Shop and Piccadilly Park, and on the same block as a group of shops along Dolores Street that include the Isabel Leidig Building, W. C. Farley Building, Percy Parkes Building, De Yoe Building, Tuck Box, and El Paseo Building. This group of buildings are some of the most architecturally significant commercial stores in Carmel.

The Draper Leidig Building is a white stucco mixed-use building with a two-story front section and a one-story rear section. It has a Spanish tile roof, and a residential patio is over the rear portion of the building. On the ground floor, in the front, there are four arches with green canvas canopies that front four retail stores with separate entrances and display windows. Under each window there is a façade of decorative Spanish tile. The second story of the front is a residence occupied by the owner, with a large, vaulted ceiling, French doors leading to a balcony with a patterned tile railing overlooking Dolores Street. The left-side of the front roof has an angled Spanish tile roof, while the other portion has a gable Spanish red tile roof with red bricks under the eaves.

The building qualifies for inclusion in the city's Downtown Conservation District Historic Property Survey, and has been nominated and submitted to the California Register of Historical Resources on May 22, 2002, by Richard N. Janick. The property is significant under the California Register criterion 3, in architecture, as a Spanish Revival style design by the architectural firm of Blaine & Olsen, of Oakland. Developer Samuel Finley Brown Morse made use of this Spanish style for houses built in Pebble Beach, California, and the style was used in downtown Carmel in the late 1920s. This building is also part of a block of commercial buildings on Dolores Street, between Ocean Avenue and 7th Avenue, that demonstrate Carmel's historic commercial development during this time.

This Leidig property has been the home of several businesses over the years. In 1929, it was the site of the Town & Country Shop, Paul Mercurio's Barber Shop, Carmel Taxi Company, and the Phillips Shop. Several additions and remodeling’s took place over the years. In 1965, a downstairs interior remodel was done by Carl Moberg for $1.000. A downstairs interior remodel was done by in 1975 for $4,500. In 2001, an elevator tower addition to the rear of the building and access to the second floor was done by architect Melvin E. Pitchard and contractor Lewelleyn Construction for $25,000.

See also
List of Historic Buildings in Carmel-by-the-Sea

References

External links

 Downtown Conservation District Historic Property Survey

1929 establishments in California
Carmel-by-the-Sea, California
Buildings and structures in Monterey County, California
Spanish Colonial Revival architecture in California